Koinadugu District is a district in the Northern Province of Sierra Leone. It is the largest District in Sierra Leone in geographical area, and one of the least most densely populated. Its capital and largest city is Kabala, which is also one of the main cities in Northern Sierra Leone. Koinadugu District is subdivided into eleven chiefdoms.

The District of Koinadugu borders Bombali on the west, Tonkolili District to the south-west, Kono District to the south, Falaba District to the east, and the Republic of Guinea to north east. Diamond mining is a major economic activity in the district, as well as agricultural production of rice, mango, cacao, and coconut.

The population of Koinadugu district is almost entirely made up of five main ethnic groups: the Kuranko, Mandingo, Fula, Limba, and Yalunka. These five ethnic groups are politically and culturally  influential in Koinadugu District. Koinadugu District is overwhelmingly Muslim majority at over 90% and Islam dominates the religious and cultural practices in the district. There is also a small but significant minority Christian population in the district, and is mainly among the Limba people in the district.

Government
The District of Koinadugu is governed with a district council form of government, which is headed by a District Council Chairman, who is responsible for the general management of the district and for seeing that all local laws are enforced. The District Council Chairman is elected directly by the residents of Koinadugu District. The Council Hall of Koinadugu District located in the district capital of Kabala. The current chairman of  Koinadugu district council is Sheku Samuel Kamara of the All People's Congress (APC).

Administrative divisions

Chiefdoms
The district is made up of eleven chiefdoms as the third level of administrative subdivision.

Dembelia Sikunia – Sikunia
Diang – Kondembaia
Folasaba – Musaia
Kasunko – Fadugu
Mongo – Bendugu
Neya – Krubola
Nieni – Yiffin
Sengbe – Yogomaia
Sulima – Falaba
Wara-Wara Bafodea – Bafodea
Wara-Wara Yagala – Gbawuria

Demography
Koinadugu District is by far the largest district in Sierra Leone and with an estimated population of 265,765. The major ethnic groups in the district are the Fula (who predominate in the district's largest city of Kabala), Kuranko (who predominate in the chiefdoms), Mandingo and Limba and Yalunka (predominant in Musaia and Falaba areas bordering the republic of Guinea (Conakry)).

Religion

Members of Parliament
Koinadugu District currently has 7 Representatives in the Parliament of Sierra Leone, of which one member wasn't elected to a 5-year term.

Economy
Gold mining is a major economic activity in the district, as well as agricultural productivity such as rice, mango, beans, cattle rearing, to name but few.

Villages
 

Kobaia

See also
Ebola virus epidemic in Sierra Leone

References

External links
https://web.archive.org/web/20120518010418/http://news.sl/drwebsite/exec/view.cgi?archive=6&num=16694
https://web.archive.org/web/20110817161321/http://handokotantra.net/local-councils-a-pivotal-but-disappointing-role-in-sierra-leones-socio-political-and-economic-development-debate.html
http://www.daco-sl.org/encyclopedia/7_lib/7_2g_ku.htm
https://web.archive.org/web/20070121122533/http://www.statehouse-sl.org/member-parliament.html
"The fight to save the last Ebola-free district in Sierra Leone" by Todd C. Frankel, Washington Post, October 10, 2014

Districts of Sierra Leone
Northern Province, Sierra Leone